Nikolaos Angelakis (15 May 1905 – 29 October 1986) was a Greek footballer who played as a forward and a later manager.

Career
Angelakis played for Aris and was a member of the 1932 side that won the Greek championship. That year, he was top-scorer of the Greek League with 15 goals (tied with teammate Nikos Kitsos).

He passed his whole career as a footballer of Aris, and is the top scorer with 14 goals in the matches against PAOK, the biggest "rivals" of Aris from the city.

During his career, Angelakis was capped 11 times by the Greece national football team and scored two goals, his debut coming in 1929.

Angelakis was the first of three generations of the Aggelakis family to be on the staff of Aris. He is the father of Rigas, who played football for Aris, and the grandfather of the present-day referee with the same name.

He scored overall 235 goals in 293 matches (105 in 132 official matches) with the shirt of Aris, breaking many goal-scoring records, and among them holds the record of 6 goals during a football half, in a league match in 1932.

Honours

As a player

Aris
Panhellenic Championship: 1927–28, 1931–32
Macedonia FCA Championship: 1923–24, 1925–26, 1927–28, 1928–29, 1929–30, 1930–31, 1933–34, 1937–38

Individual
Panhellenic Championship top scorer: 1927–28

As a manager

Aris
Panhellenic Championship: 1945–46
Macedonia FCA Championship: 1948–49, 1952–53

See also
List of one-club men in football

References

External links
Reference to the "late" Nikolaos Aggelakis 

1900s births
1986 deaths
Greek footballers
Greece international footballers
Super League Greece players
Aris Thessaloniki F.C. players
Aris Thessaloniki F.C. managers
Footballers from Thessaloniki
Greek Macedonians
Association football forwards
Greek football managers